In geometry, an epicycloid is a plane curve produced by tracing the path of a chosen point on the circumference of a circle—called an epicycle—which rolls without slipping around a fixed circle. It is a particular kind of roulette.

Equations

If the smaller circle has radius , and the larger circle has radius , then the
parametric equations for the curve can be given by either:

or:

in a more concise and complex form

where 
 angle  is in turns:  
 smaller circle has radius  
 the larger circle has radius

Area

(Assuming the initial point lies on the larger circle.) When  is a positive integer, the area of this epicycloid is

It means that the epicycloid is  larger than the original stationary circle.

If  is a positive integer, then the curve is closed, and has  cusps (i.e., sharp corners).

If  is a rational number, say  expressed as irreducible fraction, then the curve has  cusps. 

Count the animation rotations to see  and 

If  is an irrational number, then the curve never closes, and forms a dense subset of the space between the larger circle and a circle of radius .

The distance  from  origin to (the point  on the small circle) varies up and down as 

where
 = radius of large circle and
 = diameter of small circle 

The epicycloid is a special kind of epitrochoid.

An epicycle with one cusp is a cardioid, two cusps is a nephroid.

An epicycloid and its evolute are similar.

Proof

Since there is no sliding between the two cycles, then we have that

By the definition of angle (which is the rate arc over radius), then we have that
 
and 
.
 
From these two conditions, we get the identity
. 
. 

From the figure, we see the position of the point  on the small circle clearly.

See also

 List of periodic functions
 Cycloid
 Cyclogon
 Deferent and epicycle
 Epicyclic gearing
 Epitrochoid
 Hypocycloid
 Hypotrochoid
 Multibrot set
 Roulette (curve)
 Spirograph

References

External links

"Epicycloid" by Michael Ford, The Wolfram Demonstrations Project, 2007

Animation of Epicycloids, Pericycloids and Hypocycloids
Spirograph -- GeoFun
Historical note on the application of the epicycloid to the form of Gear Teeth
Algebraic curves
Roulettes (curve)